The Land Reform Movement, also known by the Chinese abbreviation Tǔgǎi, was a mass movement led by the Chinese Communist Party (CCP) leader Mao Zedong during the late phase of the Chinese Civil War and the early People's Republic of China, which achieved land redistribution to the peasantry. Landlords — whose status was theoretically defined through the percentage of income derived from exploitation as opposed to labor — had their land confiscated and they were subjected to mass killing by the CCP and former tenants, with the estimated death toll ranging from hundreds of thousands to millions. The campaign resulted in hundreds of millions of peasants receiving a plot of land for the first time. 

By 1953, land reform had been completed in mainland China with the exception of Xinjiang, Tibet, Qinghai, and Sichuan. From 1953 onwards, the CCP began to implement the collective ownership of expropriated land through the creation of "Agricultural Production Cooperatives", transferring property rights of the seized land to the Chinese state. Farmers were compelled to join collective farms, which were grouped into People's communes with centrally controlled property rights.

Origins 
China's land reform was not only an economic or administrative process of taking and redistributing deeds or legal ownership of land. It was a party-led mass movement which turned peasants into active participants and which pushed for political and ideological change beyond the immediate economic question of land ownership.

It had historical antecedents in China. In the mid-19th century, the Taiping Rebellion had a short-lived program of land confiscation and redistribution and after the Xinhai Revolution in 1911, the founder of the Chinese Nationalist Party Sun Yat-sen advocated a "land to the tiller" program of equal distribution of land which was partly implemented by the Nationalist government under Chiang Kai-shek.

As early as 1927, Mao Zedong believed that the countryside would be the basis of revolution. Land reform was key for the CCP both to carry out its program of social equality and to extend its control to the countryside. Unlike in Russia before the revolution, peasants in imperial China were not in feudal bondage to large estates; they either owned their land or rented it. They marketed their crops for cash in village markets, but local elites used their connections with officialdom to dominate local society. When the central government began to lose control in the late 19th century and then disintegrated after 1911, the local gentry and clan organizations became even more powerful. Mao's 1927 Report on an Investigation of the Peasant Movement in Hunan advocated a then heretical strategy of mobilizing poor peasants to carry out "struggle" (douzheng). Mao from that point on rejected the idea of peaceful land reform, arguing that peasants could not achieve true liberation unless they participated in the violent overthrow of the landlords. In Mao's view, peasant uprisings were organic events, and as a "revolutionary party," the Communists should choose to lead them rather than stand in their way or to "trail behind them" and criticize. He concluded that "[w]ithout using the greatest force, the peasants cannot possibly overthrow the deep-rooted authority of the landlords, which has lasted for thousands of years."

In a speech at the Second National Congress in 1934, Mao addressed the significance of land reform in the context of the struggle against the civil war against the Nationalists:

The Communist Party launched various rural campaigns as precursors to land reform. These mass campaigns adjusted rent and interest to be more favorable to tenants, returned excessive deposits to renters, and overall served to weaken the traditional rural elites.

Peasant land holdings prior to reform 
During China's feudal period, a small number of landlords owned vast amounts of farmland, while the majority of Chinese were landless peasants. Land concentration continued after the 1911 Revolution overthrew the Qing Dynasty. By 1934, 4% of the population owned half of the land, while 70% of peasant households owned only 17% of the land. Frequently, poor peasants who rented land were required to pay more than half of their income to landlords.

Process of land reform 
Land reform progressed unevenly by region and in different time periods. In northern China, which had been governed by Communists since 1935, the peasants were more radical. Land reform was undertaken more quickly and more violently than in the south, especially beginning in 1950. Land reform issues were also a matter of debate within the Communist Party, and leaders disagreed over such questions as the level of violence which was to be used; whether to woo or target middle peasants, who farmed most of the land; or to redistribute all of the land to poor peasants.

Landlords were  subjected to public "struggle sessions" organised by the CCP where they were accused of crimes against the peasants and sometimes sentenced to death, including killed in public by peasants at these mass meetings. Struggle was confrontational by design, consistent with Mao's view that the masses had to actively take part in avenging past injustices. "Speaking bitterness", defined as "articulating one’s history of being oppressed and exploited by class enemies and thus stimulating others’ class hatred, and in the meantime consolidating one’s own class standpoint", was employed to fan the flames of peasant resentment towards landlords. While violence was not necessarily involved, Mao's position that the masses had to be given free rein in confronting their class enemies meant that peasant violence against those deemed landlords was common.

In the north, Communist Party cadre often tried to restrain excessive violence from peasants. Land reform proceeded more slowly and less violently in the South. There, land was owned by extended clans rather than individual landlords and poor peasants were sometimes part of the same kinship networks. In contrast to the north, the CCP had difficulty convincing poorer peasants that land should be expropriated at all. 

Rural women had a significant impact on the movement, with the Communist Party making specific efforts to mobilize them. Party activists observed that because peasant women were less tied to old power structures, that they more readily opposed those identified as class enemies. In 1947, Deng Yingchao emphasized at a land reform policy meeting that "women function as great mobilizers when they speak bitterness." The All-China Women's Federation called for Party activists to encourage peasant women to understand their "special bitterness" from a class perspective. Women activists helped peasant women prepare to speak in public, including by roleplaying as landlords to help such women practice. 

By 1952, land redistribution was generally completed. Most landlords had been permitted to retain plots of land after admitting to historical crimes, although many had been killed. The amount of cultivated land had grown, along with related infrastructure projects and availability of fertilizers and insecticides. By 1952, rural agriculture had become hugely more productive in China.

Chinese civil war era campaigns (1946–1948) 
During the Second Sino-Japanese War and the Second United Front, the party emphasized Sun Yat-sen's moderate "land to the tiller" program, which limited rent to 37.5% of the crop, rather than land redistribution. The earliest land reform campaigns following Japan's surrender focused on mobilizing peasants to take revenge on traitors who had collaborated with the Japanese. 

Throughout the land reform campaigns of the Civil War era, trends towards violent struggle against landlords coincided with increased combat in the war; when Nationalist forces or homecoming regiments were present, land reform and Civil War violence overlapped.

At the outbreak of the Civil War in 1946, Mao began to push for a return to radical policies to mobilize the village against the landlord class, but protected the rights of middle peasants and specified that rich peasants were not landlords.   

On May 4, 1946, the Party's Central Committee issued its Instructions on Land Issues. The May 4th Instructions (also referred to as the May 4th Directive) required local party committees to support landlords who approved of land acquisition by the peasantry. As part of an effort to address some concerns of some landowners and those connected to them, the May 4th Instructions stated that landlords who “had earned merit for resisting Japan” would be left the more land and that the land holdings of wealthier peasants would be mostly unchanged. The May 4th Instructions provided significant leeway for differing regional and local interpretations. In villages where land reform was occurring for the first time, the East China Bureau allowed small and medium landlords to donate land; those who did were allowed to keep more than the average middle peasant. The Northeast Bureau took a similar approach, even allowing most peasants who had served the Japanese Manchukuo regime to apologize and retain their land. In contrast to these approaches, the Central China Bureau moved more steadily towards land equalization.

The July 7 Directive of 1946 set off eighteen months of fierce conflict in which all rich peasant and landlord property of all types was to be confiscated and redistributed to poor peasants. Party work teams (gongzuodui) were the primary instrument of land reform and went from village to village and divided the population into landlords, rich, middle, poor, and landless peasants. Because the work teams did not involve villagers in the process, rich and middle peasants quickly returned to power.

From July to September 1947, the Communist Party held a National Land Conference to formulate the Outline of the Chinese Land Law. Issued in October 1947, the Outline identified the goal of "[t]he abolition of feudal and semi-feudal exploitation of the land system and the implementation of the cultivator owning the field." The Outline Land Law codified confiscation of land from rich peasants. According to Historian William H. Hinton, it "played the same role as did Lincoln's Manifesto of Liberating Black Slaves during the American Civil War."

Late 1947 directives from the Party called for more lenient treatment for allies among the rural elite in established base areas whom the Party viewed as sufficiently enlightened. The Party instructed work teams and cadres not to dampen the enthusiasm of the peasant masses, but also to convince activists to minimize beatings and to oppose spontaneous executions.

Party central sent the work teams back to the villages to put poor and landless peasants in charge, mandating the elimination of land rent, which it compared to feudal exploitation, and the elimination of landlord status. The work teams mobilized poor and landless peasants to take direct and violent action against the leading clans and families of neighboring villages to ensure that family loyalties not interfere with the campaign. In one village in southern Hebei, foreign observers recorded that four people were stoned to death, and Hinton reported that at least a dozen purported rich peasants or landlords were beaten to death in the village he called Longbow.

Land reform movement violence surged in early 1948, prompting some Party leaders such as Xi Zhongxun and Ren Bishi to criticize the movement. Ren announced a policy shift in January 1948, guaranteeing that targets of the movement would nonetheless be allowed to keep a share of property. This policy change contributed to a shift away from economic struggle and to political struggle. The Party instructed that fewer landlords should be targeted and work teams should not beat or torture their targets.

Land reform was a decisive factor in the result of the Chinese Civil War. At the time of the Communist victory, more than half of the population living in Communist areas had participated in land reform and over 25 million hectares of land had been redistributed, largely as a result of confiscations form landlords and rich peasants. Millions of peasants who obtained land through the movement joined the People's Liberation Army or assisted in its logistical networks. According to academic Brian DeMare, land redistribution was a critical factor in the Communists' military success in the civil war because land reforms linked the interests of north and northeast Chinese peasants to the Party's success. The success of land reform meant that at the founding of the PRC in 1949, China could credibly claim that for the first time since the late Qing period that it had succeeded in feeding one fifth of the world's population with only 7% of the world's cultivable land.

Early People's Republic of China campaigns (1949–1953) 
The Land Reform Movement continued during peace time. The round of land reform carried out in the winter 1949-1950 involved treatment of landlords that were considerably more lenient than in the Civil War era land reforms, with most landlords avoiding struggle. In summer 1950, the Land Reform Law of the People's Republic of China made more lenient treatment of landlords the official policy. Landlords would be allowed to keep commercial enterprises and personal belongings other than the "five big properties." These "five big properties" --- land, draft animals, excess grain, agricultural tools, and surplus housing -- were still subject to redistribution. The 1950 Land Reform law was also explicit that the land of middle peasants should not be redistributed. It also stated that the rich peasant economy must be preserved and that law-abiding rich peasants must not be subjected to struggle sessions.

In this period, the Party's view was that fewer targets were necessary in order to unite a broad base in opposition to a limited number of landlords. According to this view, a focused attack on the landlord class's core would also result in compliance from small and medium landlords. The Party instructed work teams to refrain from indiscriminate struggle, which was now viewed as "illegal struggle." Pursuant to these directives, the East China Bureau tested a new struggle method in which the most exploitive or criminal landlords (deemed "evil tyrants") would be sent to trial but that work teams would meet with other landlords to explain land reform policy and their comparatively lenient treatment under it. The East China Bureau encountered no resistance from these latter landlords and the Party deemed this test program in non-violent struggle a total success.

However, the Korean War prompted Party leadership to be concerned that landlords might use the conflict to oppose the new rural order, increasing the view that violent struggle was necessary to defeat class enemies. Land reform in May 1951, according to Mao biographer Philip Short, "lurched violently to the left" with Mao Zedong laying down new guidelines for "not correcting excesses prematurely." Beatings, while not officially promoted by the party, were not prohibited either. While landlords had no protection, those who were branded "rich peasants" received moderate protections from violence and those who were on the lower end were fully protected. In this vein, Mao insisted that the people themselves, not the public security organs, should become involved in enacting the Land Reform Law and killing the landlords who had oppressed them, in contrast to the Soviet practice of dekulakization. Mao thought that peasants who killed landlords who had oppressed them would become permanently linked to the revolutionary process in a way that passive spectators could not be. Although violence came to be particularly frowned upon by the Party in the final rounds of land reform, in practice the struggle by peasants against landlords continued to be often brutal.

In the early PRC era, there were millions of war widows. Widows whose husbands had fought in Communist armies received land through the land reform movement, as well as assistance farming it.

Mass killings of landlords 

Those who were killed were targeted on the basis of their social class rather than their ethnicity; the neologism classicide is used to describe the killings. Class-motivated mass murder continued almost throughout the 30 years of social and economic transformation in Maoist China, and by the end of the reforms, the landlord class had largely been eliminated from Mainland China or it had fled to Taiwan.

In his Report on the Peasant Movement in Hunan, Mao addressed Party members who were concerned with violence by the peasants against landlords, arguing that these concerns were a tool for continuing the oppression of the peasants. In this context, Mao coined his famous comment that "revolution is not a dinner party." Mao wrote in response to objections to violence:

The Communist Party's tolerance of, encouragement of, or efforts to restrain, violence by peasants against landlords in the course of the land reform movement varied over time and location. Its directions were not always followed, and as late as the final rounds of land reform, Hu Yaobang had to explain that the call to "annihilate" the landlord class meant taking landlord property not landlord lives.

Jean-Louis Margolin argues that the killings were not a pre-condition for land reform, because in Taiwan and Japan, land reforms were launched with little violence. Rather the violence was a result of the fact that the land reform was less about redistribution (because within a few years of the reforms, most of the land had to be surrendered to collective farms) than it was about eliminating "rural class enemies" and the assumption of local power by the communists. Margolin observes that even in very poor villages (which covered half of Northern China) where nobody could qualify as a landlord, some landlords were "manufactured" so they could be persecuted. In Wugong village, 70 households (out of a total of 387 households) were converted from middle peasants into rich peasants, making them acceptable targets for class struggle. There were policies in certain regions of China (not necessarily obeyed) which required the selection of "at least one landlord, and usually several, in virtually every village for public execution". An official reported 180 to 190 thousand landlords were executed in the Kwangsi province alone, in addition a Catholic school teacher reported 2.5% of his village was executed. Some condemned as landlords were buried alive, dismembered, strangled or shot. In many villages, landlords' women were "redistributed" as concubines or daughters for peasants or pressured into marrying their husband's persecutors.

Estimated number of deaths 
Estimates for the number of deaths range from a lower estimate of 200,000 to 800,000, and higher estimates of 2,000,000 to 5 million executions for the years 1949–1953, along with 1.5 million to 6 million sent to "reform through labour" (Laogai) camps, where many perished. Philip Short wrote that such estimates exclude the hundreds of thousands driven to suicide during "struggle sessions" of the three-anti/five-anti campaigns, which also occurred around the same time. Zhou Enlai estimated 830,000 had been killed, while Mao Zedong estimated as many as 2 to 3 million were killed. Deng Zihui, Vice Chairman of the Central South Military and Administrative Council, estimated that 15% of China's 50,000,000 landlords and rich peasants had been "sentenced to death", 25% had been "sent to labor reform camps for remolding through manual work" and 60% to "participation in production work under supervision". Not all of those sentenced to death were actually executed and therefore there is no way of knowing the exact number of performed executions.

Retaliation by landlords 
During the Chinese Civil War, the Kuomintang established the "Huanxiang Tuan", or the Homecoming Legion, which was composed of landlords who sought the return of their redistributed land and property from peasants and CCP guerrillas, and the release of forcibly conscripted peasants and communist POWs. The Homecoming legion conducted its guerrilla warfare campaign against CCP forces and purported collaborators up until the end of the civil war in 1949.

Many landlords used violence to oppose land reform including after the defeat of the Kuomintang. Some landlords poisoned wells, destroyed agricultural tools, or cut down forests. The Communist Party widely disseminated stories of landlords' crimes as an effort to build support for its view of the landlord class as a whole.

Land redistribution
Land seized from Landlords was brought under collective ownership, resulting in the creation of "Agricultural production cooperatives". In the mid-1950s, a second land reform during the Great Leap Forward compelled individual farmers to join collectives, which, in turn, were grouped into People's communes with centrally controlled property rights and an egalitarian principle of distribution. This policy was generally a failure in terms of production. The PRC reversed this policy in 1962 through the proclamation of the Sixty Articles. As a result, the ownership of the basic means of production was divided into three levels with collective land ownership vested in the production team.

Economic effects 

As an economic reform program, the land reform succeeded in redistributing about 43% of China's cultivated land to approximately 60% of the rural population. Poor peasants increased their holdings, while middle peasants benefitted most because of their strong initial position. The movement expropriated land from over ten million landlords. Historian Walter Scheidel writes that the violence of the land reform campaign had a significant impact in reducing economic inequality. He gives as an example the 1940s campaigns in village of Zhangzhuangcun, made famous by William Hinton's book Fanshen. Although poor and middle peasants had already owned 70% of the land: In Zhangzhuangcun, in the more thoroughly reformed north of the country, most "landlords" and "rich peasants" had lost all their land and often their lives or had fled. All formerly landless workers had received land, which eliminated this category altogether. As a result, "middling peasants," who now accounted for 90 percent of the village population, owned 90.8 percent of the land, as close to perfect equality as one could possibly hope for.Following conclusion of the land reform movement, harvests and incomes increased.

Land reform on Taiwan

After its retreat to Taiwan, the Nationalist government carried out a program of land reform under the Joint Commission on Rural Reconstruction. The land reform law removed the landlord class, and created a higher number of peasants who, with the help of the state, dramatically increased Taiwan's agricultural output. Land reform also succeeded because the Kuomintang's members were mostly from mainland China and, as a result, had few ties with the remaining indigenous Taiwanese landowners.

See also 
 Crimes against humanity under communist regimes
 Criticism of communist party rule
 Dekulakization
 Land reform by country
List of massacres in China
 Mass killings under communist regimes

Notes

References

Bibliography and further reading

External links

 Land Reform and Collectivization (1950-1953) Posters from the Stephan Landsberger collection. There are other posters on the topic in other sections of the site.

Political repression in China
Campaigns of the Chinese Communist Party
Communist repression
Political and cultural purges
Massacres in China
Human rights abuses in China
Class discrimination
Politicides
Cold War history of China
Mass murder in 1947
Mass murder in 1948
Mass murder in 1949
Mass murder in 1950
Mass murder in 1951
1950s murders in China
1940s murders in China 
1947 murders in China
1951 murders in China
Chinese landlords
Mao Zedong
Land reform
Man-made disasters in China
Massacres committed by the People's Republic of China